Tall Stories may refer to:

 Tall Stories (band), an American rock band, and their self-titled album
 Tall Stories (Johnny Hates Jazz album), 1991

See also
 Seven Stories (band), an Australian rock group, initially called Tall Stories
 Tall Story, a 1960 American sports comedy film